Vincent "Fish" Cafaro (born  August 27, 1933) was a mobster and protegee of Anthony "Fat Tony" Salerno, a top lieutenant in the Genovese crime family, until becoming a government informant and witness.

Labor racketeer
Cafaro was born in the small town of Gambugliano near Vicenza, Italy, but grew up in the East Harlem section of New York. In 1974, Cafaro became a made man, or full member, in the Genovese family and was assigned to Salerno's crew, based out of the Palma Boys Social Club in East Harlem.

From 1974 to 1986, Cafaro was influential in the N.Y.C. District Council of Carpenters rackets. Cafaro received payoff money from fellow East Harlem native and Genovese captain Vincent DiNapoli. DiNapoli's top associate, Teddy Maritas, was President of the District Council.  Cafaro's representative in the Carpenters Union was Onofrio "Frankie Zip" Acramone.  Cafaro would have Acramone set up meetings with other union officers to gain further influence in the union. Cafaro and Acramone worked with DiNapoli's representatives Attilio Bitondo, Anthony Fiorino, and Gambino crime family representative Carmine Fiore on labor rackets during the construction of the Javits Convention Center in Manhattan.  

DiNapoli eventually went to prison for labor racketeering; Maritas disappeared after being indicted.  While DiNapoli was in prison, he learned that Cafaro was gaining influence in the District Council.  Worried about his turf, DiNapoli took the problem to boss Salerno.  Salerno sided with DiNapoli and forced Cafaro to return the union rackets to DiNapoli.

Government informant
On March 21, 1986, Cafaro and 14 other mobsters were indicted on federal racketeering charges involving concrete supply companies. In September 1986, while in jail awaiting trial, Cafaro contacted the government about becoming a government informant and witness. In October 1986, the government released Cafaro on bail. From October 1986 to March 1987, Cafaro attended family meetings wearing a recording device. On March 20, 1987, the government revealed in court that Cafaro was now working for them. Cafaro's son Thomas was indicted at the same case, and the government offered him a plea agreement also.  However, Thomas decided to plead guilty and go to prison to assure the Genovese family that he was still loyal.  

Vincent Cafaro later testified about the Genovese family involvement in large scale  labor racketeering; their control over the New York District Council of Carpenters; and the family's organizational structure.  Cafaro also exposed the Genovese family's control over the New York Coliseum and the Javits Center.  He also described how Salerno, after suffering a stroke, became a figurehead for new boss Vincent "The Chin" Gigante. This maneuver helped deflect law enforcement scrutiny of Gigante's affairs. When Salerno was eventually convicted and sentenced to 100 years in prison in the Commission case, the real family boss, Gigante, was still free.

In October 1987, Cafaro told prosecutors that he was breaking his cooperation deal because of fear for his immediate family. On February 20, 1988, Cafaro refused to answer some questions in court during a drug trial for Liborio Bellomo and three other defendants. In 1989 and 1990, Cafaro testified against Gambino boss John Gotti and then disappeared into the federal Witness Protection Program.

References

Further reading
Goldstock, Ronald, Martin Marcus and II Thacher. Corruption and Racketeering in the New York City Construction Industry: Final Report of the New York State Organized Crime Task Force. New York: NYU Press, 1990. 
Jacobs, James B., Coleen Friel and Robert Radick. Gotham Unbound: How New York City Was Liberated from the Grip of Organized Crime. New York: NYU Press, 2001. 
Jacobs, James B., Christopher Panarella and Jay Worthington. Busting the Mob: The United States Vs. Cosa Nostra. New York: NYU Press, 1994. 
Jacobs, James. Organized Crime and Its Containment: A Transatlantic Initiative. Lieden, Netherlands: Brill Academic Publishers, 1991. 
Paoli, Letizia. Mafia Brotherhoods: Organized Crime, Italian Style. New York: Oxford University Press, 2003. 
Raab, Selwyn. Five Families: The Rise, Decline, and Resurgence of America's Most Powerful Mafia Empires. New York: St. Martin Press, 2005.

External links
United States of America v. Vincent Cafaro and the District Council of New York City and Vicinity of the United Brotherhood of Carpenters and Joiners of America, United States Southern District Court of New York
United States of America v. Anthony Salerno and Vincent Cafaro, United States Court of Appeals for the Second Circuit

1933 births
Living people
American gangsters of Italian descent
Genovese crime family
People who entered the United States Federal Witness Protection Program
People from East Harlem